The Sanyi Wood Sculpture Museum is a museum of wooden sculpture in Sanyi Township, Miaoli County, Taiwan.

History
The museum building was constructed in March 1990 by the Construction Department of the Taiwan Provincial Government. Originally established as Sanyi Wood Sculpture Arts Gallery, it was then later renamed to Sanyi Wood Sculpture Museum. The museum was opened to public on 9 April 1995. In May 2003, the museum underwent renovations to expand its storeroom for permanent collections.

Exhibition themes
The museum presents the following themes:
 Introduction of Wood Sculpture
 Styles of Each Chinese Dynasty
 Austronesian Tribe Wood Sculpture
 Origins of Sanyi Wood Sculpture
 Wood Sculpture Exhibition Hall
 Temples Deities
 Architecture and Furniture
 Exhibition of Mix Media
 Invitational Exhibition

Transportation
The museum is accessible within walking distance southwest from Sanyi Station of the Taiwan Railways.

See also
 List of museums in Taiwan
 Art in Taiwan

References

External links

 

1995 establishments in Taiwan
Buildings and structures completed in 1990
Museums established in 1995
Art museums and galleries in Taiwan
Sculpture galleries in Taiwan
Museums in Miaoli County
Sanyi Wood Sculpture Museum